Ben Clark is an American politician who served in the North Carolina Senate from the 21st district (representing constituents in Hoke and Cumberland counties) from 2013 to 2023. He also served as secretary of the Senate Democratic caucus. On September 20, 2021, Clark announced he wouldn't seek re-election in 2022. On November 22, 2021, Clark announced he would run for the congress in the newly-drawn NC-09 Congressional district.

NC Senate

During five terms in the NC Senate, Clark has made his focus supporting the military, expanding healthcare access, and providing every child with a sound education. Clark led the effort to reopen NC schools after COVID-19 rates fell. He was 1 of 4 Democratic conferees on the 2021 budget that repealed NC taxes on military retirement income

Electoral history

2020

2018

2016

2014

2012

References

External links

 Ben Clark for Congress campaign website
 Senator Ben Clark official legislative website

21st-century American politicians
21st-century African-American politicians
African-American state legislators in North Carolina
Candidates in the 2022 United States House of Representatives elections
Living people
Democratic Party North Carolina state senators
People from Fort Bragg, North Carolina
People from Raeford, North Carolina
1959 births